The Olyutor Bay is a gulf or bay of the Bering Sea in Olyutorsky District, northern part of Kamchatka Krai, Russia.

Geography
It is bounded on the west by the Govena Peninsula which separates it from Korfa Bay and on the east by the Olyutor Peninsula, the southern part of the Olyutor Range. Beyond Cape Olyutor lies the Bering Sea.

The bay is normally covered by fast ice from December to May.

See also 
 Shirshov Ridge

References

Bays of the Bering Sea
Bays of Russia
Bodies of water of the Kamchatka Peninsula
Bays of Kamchatka Krai